Beautiful Dreams is the twelfth album by British-Irish singer-songwriter Chris de Burgh, released in 1995. It is a collection of songs recorded with a full orchestra. It includes a mix of his own songs from previous albums, three new songs and three cover versions.

Track listing
All tracks composed by Chris de Burgh; except where indicated.

Bonus track listing

"In Love Forever", "I'm Not Crying Over You" and "One More Mile to Go" were three new songs written for this album.

"Girl" is missing on compact cassette.

"This is the album I've always wanted to make; a live studio recording of personal favourites, old classics and new songs, with full orchestra and choir. It was recorded in London over a period of eight days (instead of the usual three-four months) in July '95, and to sing each track surrounded by an orchestra, without the benefit of the safety-net of modern technology, was immensely exciting - everything in one take, the way it used to be!"

Personnel 

 Chris de Burgh – vocals
 Peter Oxendale – acoustic piano, musical director 
 Dave "Clem" Clempson – acoustic guitar, electric guitar 
 John Themis – acoustic guitar, guitar soloist 
 John Giblin – bass guitar 
 Ian Thomas – drums 
 Miles Bould – percussion 
 Nick Ingman – arrangements and conductor (1, 2, 5, 7-13) 
 Richard Hewson – arrangements and conductor (3, 4, 6) 
 The London Session Orchestra – orchestra 
 Gavyn Wright – orchestra leader 
 GWALIA – Welsh Male Voice Choir

Production 

 Produced by Chris de Burgh 
 Recorded by Ben Darlow and Mike Ross at Whitfield Street Recording Studios (London, England). 
 Mixed by Ben Darlow at Nomis Studios (London, England). 
 Art Direction and Design - Mike Ross 
 Photography - Richard Haughton 
 Cover Painting - Fletcher Sibthorp 
 Cover Typography - Richard Carroll 
 Management - Kenny Thomson

Concert video release
In September 2005, de Burgh performed a concert at the Symphony Hall, Birmingham; a 90-minute VHS video of this concert was released as Beautiful Dreams Live. The first half of this concert saw de Burgh perform a solo set of songs from throughout his career. The second half was a performance of tracks from the Beautiful Dreams album, with a full orchestra. It was later released on DVD with bonus behind the scenes footage and music videos.

Video track listing
Solo set
 "Carry On"
 "Here Is Your Paradise"
 "Transmission Ends"
 "The Head and the Heart"
 "Spanish Train"
 "This Weight on Me"
 "The Simple Truth"
 "The Last Time I Cried"
 "Borderline"
 "Oh, My Brave Hearts"
 "Don't Pay the Ferryman"

Beautiful Dreams set
 "Missing You" 
 "Carry Me (Like a Fire in Your Heart)"
 "Discovery"
 "In Love Forever"
 "The Lady in Red"
 "In Dreams"
 "I'm Not Crying Over You"
 "Always on My Mind"
 "Say Goodbye to It All"
 "One More Mile to Go"
 "The Snows of New York"

Note: The tracks "Girl" and "Shine On" from the Beautiful Dreams album are not included in the video but may have been performed at the concert.

References

Chris de Burgh albums
Albums produced by Rupert Hine
1995 live albums
A&M Records live albums